Bontnewydd may refer to the following places in Wales:

Bontnewydd, Ceredigion, a village
Bontnewydd, Denbighshire, a hamlet
Bontnewydd, Gwynedd, a village